Kumaratunga Munidasa (Sinhala: කුමාරතුංග මුනිදාස; 25 July 1887 – 2 March 1944) was a pioneer Sri Lankan (Sinhalese) linguist, grammarian, commentator, and writer. He founded the Hela Havula movement, which sought to remove Sanskrit influences from the Sinhala language. Considered one of Sri Lanka's most historically significant scholars, he is remembered for his profound knowledge of the Sinhala language and its literary works.

Personal life
The second youngest of twelve siblings, Kumarathunga Munidasa was born on 25 July 1887, in Idigasaara village, Dickwella, Matara, Sri Lanka. His mother was Palavinnage Dona Gimara Muthukumarana (or Dona Baba Nona Muthukumarana) and his father was Abious (or Abiyes) Kumaranatunga. His father, a physician who practiced indigenous medicine, kept Pali and Sanskrit manuscripts on Ayurveda medicine, Astrology, and Buddhism.

Munidasa originally attended Wewurukannala Pirivena to learn Pali and Sanskrit in order to become a Buddhist monk, but his family disapproved. He then switched to the government teachers' college in Colombo, graduating in 1907 after two years of training.

In 1921, Munidasa married Lilly Laviniya. Kumarathunga Munidasa died on 2 March 1944, at the age of 56.

Career 

His first appointment was as a government teacher in the Bilingual School of Bomiriya. He was later promoted to the position of principal of the Kadugannawa Bilingual School. After 11 years, he was promoted again to the position of inspector of schools. He remained in that role for four years.

His first book, Nikaya Sangraha Vivaranaya, was an analysis of a Scripture on the Buddhist Monastic Orders. Munidasa was a member of the Sinhala Maha Sabha of the Swabhasha movement, which started as a protest against the English-educated elites. In the following years, he made several poetry and short stories such as Udaya, Hath Pana, Heen Seraya, Magul Kema and Kiyawana Nuwana.

Munidasa spoke of language, nation, and the country as a Triple Gem, linking these entities to the Buddhist concept of refuge. To pursue these sources of refuge, he founded the Hela Havula, which consisted of people who shared his views on Sinhala language and literary interest. Members of the group often engaged in debates and discussion of recommended literature. It was the starting point for many Sri Lankan scholars and artists and the organization.

Munidasa revived the Lakminipahana newspaper and started the Subasa and Helio magazines to teach and promote the correct use of Sinhala.

Novels 
Hathpana
Heenseraya
Kiyawana Nuwana
Magul Keema
"Mage pasala"
"Piya Samara"
"Shiksha Margaya"
"Sirimath"
"Nalawilla"
"Pahan Katuweki"

References

External links 
Kumaratunga Munidasa - Sri Lankan Poet
World coinage and purity of language
Why Vimukthi matters
A model father-son relationship revisited

1887 births
1944 deaths
Alumni of St. Thomas' College, Matara
Grammarians from Sri Lanka
Hela Havula
People from Matara, Sri Lanka
People from Panadura
People from British Ceylon
Sinhala language
Sinhalese writers